Carp River is a  river in Gogebic and  Ontonagon counties in the U.S. state of Michigan.  The Carp River is formed by the outflow of the Lake of the Clouds

The river is also known as the "Big Carp River" to distinguish it from the nearby Little Carp River.

Tributaries and features (from the mouth):
 Bathtub Falls
 Shining Cloud Falls
 (right) Konteka Creek
 (left) Washington Creek
 (right) Landlookers Creek
 (right) Scott Creek
 Lake of the Clouds
 Carp River Inlet (also known as Carp River, Inlet Creek and Upper Carp River)
 Trap Falls

References 

Rivers of Michigan
Rivers of Gogebic County, Michigan
Rivers of Ontonagon County, Michigan
Tributaries of Lake Superior